Imre Schlosser was a footballer who represented the Hungary national football team as a striker between 1906 and 1921, and again in 1926 and 1927. He scored his first international goal on 4 November 1906, aged 17 years and 24 days, in a 3–1 win over Austria. From there, he become both his country's and Europe's all-time top scorer in international football, scoring 59 goals in 68 times for Hungary (the team won 70% of the games in which they fielded Schlosser), resulting in a ratio of 0.87 goals per match. He held that position for 40 years, until being overtaken by Ferenc Puskás(84) and Sándor Kocsis(75) in the 50s, both members of the nation's Golden Team.

Schlosser was the first footballer to score 50 international goals, achieving the feat when he scored a brace (two goals) in a 6–2 victory against Austria on 3 June 1917. Schlosser scored 5 hat-tricks for Hungary, including a 5-goal haul in a 12–0 win over Russia and a 6-goal haul against Switzerland in a 9–0 win, but the most important came on 3 July 1912, when he netted his side's three goals in a 3–1 win over Germany in the 1912 Summer Olympics consolation tournament semi-finals, and Schlosser also scored in the final against Austria.

International goals
Scores and results list Hungary's goal tally first and score column indicates the score after each Schlosser goal.

 Note, according to Austrian sources Schlosser scored both the goals for 3–2 and 4–2; one Hungarian source credits the 4–2 to Béla Krempels.

Hat-tricks

Statistics

See also 
 List of men's footballers with 50 or more international goals
 List of footballers with 500 or more goals

References 

Hungary national football team
Schlosser, Imre